Gender polarization is a concept in sociology by American psychologist Sandra Bem which states that societies tend to define femininity and masculinity as polar opposite genders, such that male-acceptable behaviors and attitudes are not seen as appropriate for women, and vice versa. The theory is an extension of the sex and gender distinction in sociology in which sex refers to the biological differences between men and women, while gender refers to the cultural differences between them, such that gender describes the "socially constructed roles, behaviours, activities, and attributes that a given society considers appropriate for men and women". According to Bem, gender polarization begins when natural sex differences are exaggerated in culture; for example, women have less hair than men, and men have more muscles than women, but these physical differences are exaggerated culturally when women remove hair from their faces and legs and armpits, and when men engage in body building exercises to emphasize their muscle mass. She explained that gender polarization goes further, when cultures construct "differences from scratch to make the sexes even more different from one another than they would otherwise be", perhaps by dictating specific hair styles for men and women, which are noticeably distinct, or separate clothing styles for men and women. When genders become polarized, according to the theory, there is no overlap, no shared behaviors or attitudes between men and women; rather, they are distinctly opposite. She argued that these distinctions become so "all-encompassing" that they "pervade virtually every aspect of human existence", not just hairstyles and clothing but how men and women express emotion and experience sexual desire. She argued that male-female differences are "superimposed on so many aspects of the social world that a cultural connection is thereby forged between sex and virtually every other aspect of human experience".

Bem saw gender polarization as an organizing principle upon which many of the basic institutions of a society are built. For example, rules based on gender polarization have been codified into law. In western society in the fairly recent past, such rules have prevented women from voting, holding political office, going to school, owning property, serving in the armed forces, entering certain professions, or playing specific sports. For example, the first modern Olympics was a male-only sporting event from which women were excluded, and this has been identified as a prime example of gender polarization. In addition, the term has been applied to literary criticism.

According to Scott Coltrane and Michele Adams, gender polarization begins early in childhood when girls are encouraged to prefer pink over blue, and when boys are encouraged to prefer toy trucks over dolls, and the male-female distinction is communicated to children in countless ways. Children learn by observing others and by direct tutelage what they "can and cannot do in terms of gendered behavior", according to Elizabeth Lindsey and Walter Zakahi. Bem argued that gender polarization defines mutually exclusive scripts for being male and female. The scripts can have a powerful influence on how a person develops;  for example, if a person is a male, then he will likely grow to develop specific ways of looking at the world, with certain behaviors seen as 'masculine', and learn to dress, walk, talk, and even think in a socially-approved way for men. Further, any deviation from these scripts was seen as problematic, possibly defined as "immoral acts" which flout religious customs, or seen as "psychologically pathological". Bem argued that because of past polarization, women were often restricted to family-oriented roles in the private sphere, while men were seen as professional representatives in the public sphere. Cultures vary substantially by what is considered to be appropriate for masculine and feminine roles, and by how emotions are expressed.

See also
Gender binary
Gender discrimination
Gender identity
Gender role
Heterosexuality
Separate spheres
Stereotypes

References

Gender-related stereotypes
Gender roles
Dichotomies
Social constructionism